Friedrich Gulda (16 May 1930 – 27 January 2000) was an Austrian pianist and composer who worked in both the classical and jazz fields.

Biography

Early life and career
Born in Vienna the son of a teacher, Gulda began learning to play the piano at age 7 with Felix Pazofsky at the Wiener Volkskonservatorium. In 1942, he entered the Vienna Music Academy, where he studied piano and musical theory under Bruno Seidlhofer and Joseph Marx.

During World War II as teenagers, Gulda and his friend Joe Zawinul would perform forbidden music, including jazz, in violation of the government's prohibition of playing of such music.

Gulda won first prize at the Geneva International Music Competition in 1946. Initially, the jury preferred the Belgian pianist Lode Backx, but when the final vote was taken, Gulda was the winner. One of the jurors, Eileen Joyce, who favoured Backx, stormed out and claimed the other jurors were unfairly influenced by Gulda's supporters. Gulda began to play concerts worldwide. He made his Carnegie Hall debut in 1950. Together with Jörg Demus and Paul Badura-Skoda, Gulda formed what became known as the "Viennese troika".

Career as classical pianist 
Although most renowned for his Mozart and Beethoven interpretations, Gulda also performed the music of J. S. Bach (often on clavichord), Schubert, Chopin, Schumann, Debussy and Ravel. His recordings of Bach's The Well-Tempered Clavier are well regarded, but Gulda performed very few other pieces by Bach and recorded even fewer. Gulda's later reliance on co-operating with companies whose recording techniques were primitive in comparison to those espoused by more sophisticated rivals stood him in very poor stead with regard to posterity. The rescued Mozart sonata tapes issued on DG are bad in terms of recorded technical quality; likewise are the Debussy Preludes and Bach recordings of the late 1960s and early 1970s. In the late 1960s Gulda recorded the complete Beethoven sonatas. He continued to perform classical works throughout his life, composing cadenzas for two Mozart concertos, which he famously recorded with his former pupil Claudio Abbado, although he sometimes conducted from the keyboard himself. A notable feature of his Mozart recordings were his own improvisations.

Phillips Records included Gulda in its Great Pianists of the 20th Century CD box set, which came out in 1999. His piano students included Martha Argerich, who called him "my most important influence," and the conductor Claudio Abbado.

Jazz, free music and composition 
In 1956, Gulda performed and recorded at Birdland in New York City and at the Newport Jazz Festival. He organized the International Competition for Modern Jazz in 1966, and he established the International Musikforum, a school for students who wanted to learn improvisation, in Ossiach, Austria, in 1968. From the 1950s on Gulda cultivated a professional interest in jazz,  writing songs and free improvisation or open music improvisations. He also recorded as a vocalist under the pseudonym  "Albert Golowin", fooling music critics for years until it was realized that Gulda and Golowin were the same person. He played instrumental pieces, at times combining jazz, free music, and classical music in his concerts. He once said:

In jazz, he found "the rhythmic drive, the risk, the absolute contrast to the pale, academic approach I had been taught." He also took up playing the baritone saxophone.

In the 1960s, Gulda wrote a Prelude and Fugue with a theme suggesting swing. Keith Emerson liked Gulda's Fugue so much, that he often performed it in Emerson, Lake & Palmer concerts in the 1970s, and a studio version was also issued on Emerson, Lake & Palmer's The Return of the Manticore.

In addition, Gulda composed "Variations on The Doors' 'Light My Fire'" (aka '') for solo piano, and released it in 1971 on Track 11 (LP disc 1, side 2, track 1) of "The Long Road To Freedom". An earlier instrumental rock-style piano/bass/drums trio version (sans any of the complex Gulda composed and improvised variations...) of 'Light My Fire' can also be found on Gulda's album As You Like It (1970), an album that also includes standards such as "'Round Midnight" and "What Is This Thing Called Love?", as well as Gulda's classic "Blues For H.G. (dedicated to Hans Georg Brunner-Schwer)."

From the late 1960s through the 1980s – while continuing his straight-ahead swing and bop-based jazz (often in European Jazz big bands, which he often organized yearly) performances and recordings, and his classical performances and recordings, he also performed and/or recorded (often using a custom electrically amplified clavichord, percussion instruments, and a bass recorder wooden flute) with a wide range of musicians involved in Free improvisation, including: Cecil Taylor, Barre Phillips, Ursula Anders, John Surman, Albert Mangelsdorff, Stu Martin, and Fritz Pauer. Gulda spoke of a fascination with the boundaries in music, believing all music to have worth, regardless of how society judged it. He believed experiments in what he called 'free music' were wonderful musical experiences, even if nobody else believed it was music. One such experiment was a performance in which he and Ursula Anders would both improvise whilst nude and shouting about being mad.

In the late 1970s and 1980s, Gulda was involved in yearly music festivals, such as the Münchner Klaviersommer – where musical guests coming to perform over the years with him included Herbie Hancock, Joe Zawinul, and Chick Corea.

In 1980, he wrote his Concerto for Cello and Wind Orchestra, which has been called "as moving as it is lighthearted", in five movements "involving jazz, a minuet, rock, a smidgen of polka, a march and a cadenza with two spots where a star cellist must improvise."

In 1982, Gulda teamed up with jazz pianist Chick Corea, who was between the breakup of Return to Forever and the formation of his Elektric Band. Issued on The Meeting (Philips, 1984), Gulda and Corea communicate in lengthy improvisations mixing jazz ("Some Day My Prince Will Come" and the lesser known, adapted by Miles Davis song "Put Your Foot Out") and classical music (Brahms' "" ["Cradle song"]).

Gulda and Corea continued their musical relationship and recorded Mozart's Double Piano Concerto with the Concertgebouw Orchestra with Nikolaus Harnoncourt (conductor). They also played jazz piano duets of Gulda's "Fantasy For Two Pianos" and Corea's "Ping Pong For Two Pianos".

In the late 1980s and 1990s, organist/MIDI keyboardist Barbara Dennerlein also studied with and performed with Gulda.

These unorthodox practices along with sometimes refusing to follow clothing conventions (he was notoriously described as resembling, in one South German concert, "a Serbian pimp") or announce the program of his concerts in advance, earned him the nickname "terrorist pianist". In 1988, he cancelled a performance after officials of the Salzburg Festival objected to his including jazz musician Joe Zawinul on the program. When the Vienna Music Academy awarded him its Beethoven Ring in recognition of his performances, he accepted it but then later reconsidered and returned it. To promote a concert in 1999, he announced his own death in a press release so that the concert at the Vienna Konzerthaus could serve as a resurrection party.

Gulda died of heart failure at the age of 69 on 27 January 2000 at his home in Weissenbach, Austria. He is buried in the cemetery of Steinbach am Attersee, Austria. He gave instructions for there to be no obituary.

Personal life
Gulda was married twice, firstly to actress Paola Loew (1956–1966) with whom he had two sons, David Wolfgang and Paul, and secondly to Yuko Wakiyama (1967–1973) with whom he had another son, Rico. Both Paul and Rico became accomplished pianists. In 1975 Gulda began a relationship with the oratorio singer Ursula Anders which lasted until his death.

In 2007 a documentary film for television was made about his life, So what?! – Friedrich Gulda.

Decorations and awards
 1959: Austrian Cross of Honour for Science and Art
 1989: Honorary Ring of Vienna

References

External links
 Gulda-Werkstatt Official Homepage with a complete work list 
 Youngrok Lee's Gulda appreciation pages
 Life and important recordings
 Recordings and discography
 A documentary on Friedrich Gulda entitled "So What!?"
 Eight Friedrich Gulda performances (ClassicalTV) 
 Recordings with Friedrich Gulda in the Online Archive of the Österreichische Mediathek (Interviews in German). Retrieved 2 September 2019
Free Recordings with Friedrich Gulda in International Music Score Library Project (IMSLP)

1930 births
2000 deaths
Musicians from Vienna
Austrian classical pianists
Male classical pianists
Austrian jazz pianists
People who faked their own death
Third stream pianists
University of Music and Performing Arts Vienna alumni
Recipients of the Austrian Cross of Honour for Science and Art
Pupils of Joseph Marx
20th-century classical pianists
20th-century classical musicians
20th-century male musicians
Male jazz musicians